The Columbia 38 is an American sailboat that was designed by Charles Morgan as racer-cruiser and first built in 1965.

The Columbia 38 is a development of the Columbia 40.

Production
The design was built by Columbia Yachts in the United States. The company completed 39 examples between 1965 and 1967.

Design
The Columbia 38 is a recreational keelboat, built predominantly of fiberglass, with wood trim. It has a masthead sloop rig, a spooned raked stem, a raised counter transom, an internally mounted spade-type rudder and a fixed modified long keel or optional short keel with a centerboard.

The boat is fitted with a Universal Atomic 4  gasoline engine for docking and maneuvering.

The galley is located at the foot of the companionway steps on the port side and features a three-burner stove. The head is located forward on the port side, just aft of the bow "V"-berth and includes a privacy door. A hanging locker is provided opposite the head on the starboard side. Additional sleeping accommodation is found in the main cabin and includes the dinette table, which can be dropped to form a double berth, a single settee berth and an aft quarter berth.

Variants
Columbia 38
This model has a fixed modified long keel.
Columbia 38 CB
This model has a shoal draft modified long keel and a retractable centerboard.

See also
List of sailing boat types

Related development
Columbia 40

Similar sailboats
Alajuela 38
C&C 38
Catalina 38
Catalina 375
Farr 38
Hunter 380
Landfall 38
Sabre 38
Shannon 38
Yankee 38

References

Keelboats
1960s sailboat type designs
Sailing yachts
Sailboat types built by Columbia Yachts